The Wensleydale School and Sixth Form is a coeducational comprehensive school situated on Richmond Road, Leyburn, North Yorkshire, England.

History
When the Wensleydale School opened in 1959 as Leyburn County Modern School, it became the community school for the whole of Wensleydale and, in 1971 it reached further when it became a comprehensive school by combining with Yorebridge Grammar School in Askrigg. In 2008, the school opened a new Post-16 block.  Through a partnership with Queen Elizabeth College Darlington, additional courses are offered to certain year students. Approximately 500 pupils attend the school, whose ages range from 11 - 16. The majority of pupils hail from eight small, local primary schools in the Wensleydale area, although its reach does stretch further.

Awards 
In 2006 the school was awarded specialist school status as a Science College and gained a Healthy Schools award.

Notable pupils 
 Nottingham Forrest centre back Michael Dawson attended the school from 1994 to 1999.
 Wendy Morton, Conservative MP

References

External links
Ofsted
School website

Educational institutions established in 1959
Secondary schools in North Yorkshire
1959 establishments in England
Leyburn
Community schools in North Yorkshire